The Belfast Bulls were an American football team based in Belfast, Northern Ireland.

Overview

Coached by HC Buttermilk Thompson, the team was founded in 2002. The Belfast Bulls were formed late in 2002 by Chris Mitchell but in 2007 the team was led by the combined experience of Head Coach Rod Thompson, Defensive Coaches Mark Helferty and Marty McKeever, Offensive Coaches Paul Orr and John Savage.

Momentum was built as the Bulls won their first four matches and established the club as a legitimate future contender for the Shamrock Bowl title - the biggest prize in the IAFL. Although playing 8-a-side rules for the first season, it was clear that their talent and drive were a great base to improve on and achieve playing in the 11-a-side league.

The team's rookie season was 2004 where they progressed to the play-offs and were one game away from appearing in the Bowl. 2005 saw the Bulls step up another gear.

In 2008, after funding difficulties, the team was forced to fold.

2006
They competed well in 2006, despite losing some experienced players to various circumstances. They narrowly lost in the Shamrock Bowl final of 2005.

2006 Player Awards
 Most Valuable Player         - Mike Calo
 Offensive Player Of The Year - Charlie Campalani
 Defensive Player Of The Year - Mark Helferty
 Rookie Of The Year           - Tim Jebb, Connor Leckey
 Most Improved Player         - Andy Black

Season-by-season records

|-
| colspan="6" align="center" | IAFL
|-
|2004 || 5 || 3 || 0 || 3rd IAFL|| Beaten Semi-Finalists
|-
|2005 || 7 || 1 || 0 || IAFL League Champions|| Beaten Shamrock Bowl Finalists
|-
|2006 || 3 || 5 || 0 || 6th IAFL || --
|-
|2007 || 4 || 3 || 1 || IAFL North Champions || Beaten Semi-Finalists
|-
!Totals || 19 || 12 || 1
|colspan="2"| (2004–2007, excluding playoffs)

* = Current Standing

Coaching staff

Current Staff
 Head Coach - Rod Thompson
 Offensive coordinator – Rod Thompson
 Defensive coordinator – Chris Millar
 Offensive Line- Paul Orr
 Defensive Backs- Mike Scott
 Wide Receivers- Mark Helferty

Players

2006 Roster

2007 Roster

2008 Roster

External links
 IAFL official website

Sports clubs in Belfast
American football teams in Northern Ireland
2002 establishments in Northern Ireland
American football teams established in 2002
2008 disestablishments in Northern Ireland
American football teams disestablished in 2008